Four ships of the Italian Regia Marina (Royal Navy) have been named Cristoforo Colombo, after the Genoese explorer Christopher Columbus:

, a wooden-hulled ship built in the 1870s
, a steel-hulled ship built to replace the original vessel 
, a  cancelled in 1916
, a sail training ship launched in 1928, she was ceded to the Soviet Union in 1949 and given the name Dunay

Italian Navy ship names